Aw Boon Par (1888 in Rangoon, British Burma, British Raj – 1944) was an entrepreneur and Philanthropy best known for introducing Tiger Balm.

He was a son of Hakka herbalist Aw Chu-Kin. Aw was born during the British Raj Colonial rule. His father left the business to Boon-Par and after Aw Chu-Kin's death in 1908, he called his elder brother Aw Boon-Haw to run his father's apothecary, Eng Aun Tong ("The Hall of Eternal Peace") together.

Although Aw wished to stay in Yangon, his brother who had settled in Singapore in 1926 convinced him to immigrate, move the family business, and found the precursor of today's Haw Par Corporation. Boon-Haw moved to Hong Kong to manage the business from there, while Boon-Par stayed in Singapore to run the factory. Eventually, Aw closed the factory down, returned to Rangoon, and died there.

Notes

References
 King, Sam (1992) Tiger Balm King Times Books International, Singapore, 
 胡文虎
 胡文虎父女的汕頭緣

1888 births
1944 deaths
20th-century Singaporean businesspeople
Burmese people of Chinese descent
People from Yongding District, Longyan
Migrants from British Burma to British Malaya
20th-century Burmese businesspeople
Aw family